Blue Bell Knoll is the fifth studio album by Scottish alternative rock band Cocteau Twins, released on 19 September 1988 by 4AD. This was the band's first album to receive major-label distribution in the United States, as it was originally licensed by Capitol Records from 4AD for North American release. After a period of being out of print while 4AD reclaimed the American distribution rights for their back catalogue, the album (along with much of the band's 4AD material) was remastered by guitarist Robin Guthrie and reissued in 2003. Vocalist Elizabeth Fraser named the album after a peak in southern Utah called Bluebell Knoll.

Upon the album's release, it was voted as Album of the Week by Dutch radio broadcaster Omroepvereniging VARA.

In 2014, the album was repressed on 180g vinyl using new high definition masters.

Critical reception

In a contemporary review of Blue Bell Knoll, Victoria Thieberger of The Age appraised it as "everything that atmospheric music should be and usually isn't". NME also reacted positively, ranking Blue Bell Knoll at number 33 on its list of 1988's best albums. A less favourable response came from The Village Voices Robert Christgau, who wrote that "these faeries are in the aura business" and asked "what are they doing on the alternative rock charts? Ever hear the one about being so open-minded that when you lay down to sleep your brains fall out?"

AllMusic critic Ned Raggett retrospectively wrote that "Blue Bell Knoll has some striking moments that are pure Cocteaus at their best", citing the opening track "Blue Bell Knoll", "For Phoebe Still a Baby" and the U.S. single "Carolyn's Fingers" as highlights, before suggesting that "things slowly but surely slide back a bit" afterwards. Gen Williams of Drowned in Sound disagreed, saying in her 2002 review that "from start to finish, it's a record that gleams with grace and emotion; chiming, mournful guitars and layered tapestry of sounds evoke a vast array of imagery". Consequences Len Comaratta wrote that the album, "with its rich and ambitious expressiveness, returns the band to its dream pop roots in the ether." Pitchfork listed Blue Bell Knoll as the 81st best album of the 1980s, with reviewer Stuart Berman calling it "a record that courts the pop mainstream through its crisp, radiant production and also boldly rejects it through vocally smeared songs that are nigh impossible to sing along to."

Track listing

Personnel
 Elizabeth Fraser – vocals
 Robin Guthrie – guitar, keyboards, synth & drum machine programming, production
 Simon Raymonde – bass guitar, keyboards

Charts

References

External links
 Blue Bell Knoll lyric interpretations

Cocteau Twins albums
1988 albums
4AD albums